Melia Watras is an American violist, composer and professor of viola. She is a soloist, chamber musician and recording artist, who has commissioned, premiered and recorded numerous new compositions, and appeared at venues such as Carnegie Hall, Weill Recital Hall and Alice Tully Hall. Her compositions have been performed in the United States and Europe. Educated at Indiana University and the Juilliard School, Watras has been on the faculty of the University of Washington in Seattle since the fall of 2004.

Education
Watras attended Indiana University, where she studied with Abraham Skernick and Atar Arad, earning bachelor's and master's degrees and the prestigious Performer's Certificate. While at Indiana, she served as Arad's teaching assistant. She studied chamber music at the Juilliard School, while also teaching as an assistant to the Juilliard String Quartet.

Career

Performing and recording artist
As a recording artist, Watras has garnered considerable attention and praise from the media. Her solo CDs have been recognized by publications such as Gramophone (which hailed her as “an artist of commanding and poetic personality”), The Strad, ("staggeringly virtuosic") and Strings (“Watras is a young player in possession of stunning virtuosic talent and deserving of the growing acclaim”). She has been heard on numerous radio programs, including NPR's All Things Considered and Performance Today, and a live performance for the Danish Broadcasting Corporation.

Composers that have written works especially for Watras include: Alessandra BarrettCharles Corey, Brent Michael Davids, Joël-François Durand, Orlando Jacinta García, Richard Karpen, Garth Knox, Anne Leilehua Lanzilotti, Shih-Wei Lo, Juan Pampin, Joshua Parmenter, Shulamit Ran, Kathryn Sullivan, Heinrich Taube, Diane Thome, Cuong Vu, Andrew Waggoner, Anna Weesner and Frances White. As a soloist and chamber musician, Watras has given world premieres of works by Atar Arad, Charles Corey, John Corigliano, Brent Michael Davids, Tina Davidson, Alexander De Varon, Joël-François Durand, Orlando Jacinta García, Jesse Jones, Richard Karpen, Garth Knox, Michael Jinsoo Lim, Shih-Wei Lo, Patrick Long, Eric Maestri, Anthony Moore, Jeffrey Mumford, Ichiro Nodaira, Juan Pampin, Joshua Parmenter, Robert Pound, Shulamit Ran, Adam Silverman, Kathryn Sullivan, Sir John Taverner, Heinrich Taube, Diane Thome, Dan Visconti, Cuong Vu, Andrew Waggoner, Melia Watras, Anna Weesner, Frances White, Theodore Wiprud, Tamar Witkin and Mischa Zupko.

Watras is violist of the Seattle-based ensemble, Frequency, a group she has composed for and recorded with on Planet M Records. For twenty years, Watras concertized worldwide and recorded extensively as violist of the renowned Corigliano Quartet, which she co-founded. The ensemble's album on the Naxos label was honored as one of the Ten Best Classical Recordings of the Year by The New Yorker. Other chamber music explorations include improvising in concert with jazz innovators Cuong Vu and Ted Poor. She and Vu premiered and recorded a work of his for viola and trumpet.

Composer
Watras's compositions have been performed in New York City, Chicago, Seattle, Bloomington (IN), Denmark and Spain. She has been commissioned by Avalon String Quartet, Rachel Lee Priday (violin), Michael Jinsoo Lim (violin), Sæunn Thorsteinsdóttir (cello), Cristina Valdés (piano), Rose Wollman (viola), and has had works performed by artists such as Atar Arad (viola), Galia Arad (voice), Winston Choi (piano), Catherine Connors (voice), Charles Corey (Harmonic Canon and Bass Marimba), Frequency Ensemble, Manuel Guillén (violin), Yura Lee (violin), Tawnya Popoff (viola), Bonnie Whiting (percussion) and Vina Vu Valdés (voice). Her music has been heard on National Public Radio’s Performance Today, and can be found on her albums Schumann Resonances and 26. Watras's adaptation of John Corigliano's Fancy on a Bach Air for viola is published by G. Schirmer, Inc. and can be heard on her Viola Solo album.

Professor
Watras serves as Professor of Viola at the University of Washington, where she holds the Adelaide D. Currie Cole Endowed Professorship, was awarded the Donald E. Petersen Endowed Fellowship and the Royalty Research Fund and has served as chair of Strings. Watras has given viola and chamber music classes throughout the United States and abroad, at schools such as Indiana University, Cleveland Institute of Music, Strasbourg Conservatoire (France), and Chosun University (South Korea). She has returned on a number of occasions to her alma mater, Indiana, to teach as a guest professor.

Discography

Solo recordings
Atar Arad: Caprice Four (George) for viola solo (2003) (CD SLE 70002)
Atar Arad: Sonata for Viola Solo (1992) (CD FDS 57962)
J.S. Bach/Kodály: Chromatic Fantasy (CD FDS 57962)
Luciano Berio: Naturale for solo viola, percussion and recorded voice (19850; with Matthew Kocmieroski, percussion (CD SLE 70002)
Rebecca Clarke: Passacaglia on an Old English Tune for viola and piano; with Kimberly Russ, piano (CD FDS 58007)
John Corigliano (arr. Watras): Fancy on a Bach Air (1997) for solo viola* (CD FDS 57962)
Brent Michael Davids: Viola Jokes for viola and tenor (2005)*; with William George, tenor (CD FDS 57992)
Georges Enescu: Concert Piece for viola and piano; with Kimberly Russ, piano (CD FDS 58007)
Betsy Jolas: Episode sixième for viola solo (1984)* (CD FDS 58007)
Richard, Karpen: Aperture for amplified viola and interactive electronics (2006)* (CD FDS 57992)
György Ligeti: Loop (1994) from Sonata for viola solo (CD FDS 58007)
Juan Pampin: Nada for viola and live electronics (2006)* (CD FDS 57992)
Krzystof Penderecki: Cadenza per Viola Solo (CD FDS 57962)
Quincy Porter: Speed Etude for viola and piano (CD FDS 58007)
Paola Prestini: Sympathique* (CD FDS 57962)
Shulamit Ran: Perfect Storm for viola solo (2010)* (CD SLE 70002)	
Igor Stravinsky: Elégie (CD FDS 57962)
Heinrich Taube: Tacoma Narrows for viola and tape (2006)* (CD FDS 57992)
Diane Thome: And Yet... for viola and computer realized sound (2006)* (CD FDS 57992)
Henri Vieuxtemps: Elégie for viola and piano, Op. 30; with Kimberly Russ, piano (CD FDS 58007)
Dan Visconti: Hard-Knock Stomp for viola solo (2000)* (CD FDS 58007)
Andrew Waggoner: Collines parmi étoiles... (2003)* (CD FDS 57962)
Andrew Waggoner: Elle s’enfuit for viola and piano (2008)*; with Kimberly Russ, piano (CD FDS 58007)

Melia Watras: Lament for viola solo (2016)* (CD PMR 002) 
Melia Watras: Sonata for viola solo (2012)* (CD SLE 70007)
Melia Watras: Photo by Mikel for viola solo (2012)* (CD SLE 70007)
Anna Weesner: Flexible Parts for viola and piano (2008)*; with Kimberly Russ, piano (CD FDS 58007)
Henryk Wieniawski: Rêverie for viola and piano; with Kimberly Russ, piano (CD FDS 58007)

Chamber music recordings (selected)
Atar Arad: Esther for two violas (2008)*; Atar Arad and Melia Watras, violas (CD SLE 70007)
Atar Arad: Toccatina a la Turk for two violas (2008)*; Atar Arad and Melia Watras, violas
(CD SLE 70007)
Luciano Berio: Black is the color... (from Folk Songs) for mezzo-soprano, viola and harp; Galia Arad, voice; Melia Watras viola; Valerie Muzzolini-Gordon, harp (CD SLE 70002)
Richard Karpen: Bicinium for violin and viola (2014)*; Michael Jinsoo Lim, violin; Melia Watras, viola (CD SLE 70007)
Richard Karpen: Tertium Quid for violin, viola and piano (2015)*; Michael Jinsoo Lim, violin; Melia Watras, viola; Winston Choi, piano (CD PMR 001)
Garth Knox: Stranger for viola and viola d’amore (2014)*; Melia Watras, viola; Garth Knox, viola d’amore (CD SLE 70007)
George Rochberg: Sonata for viola and piano (1979); Melia Watras, viola; Winston Choi, piano (CD SLE 70002)
Robert Schumann: Märchenbilder (Pictures from Fairyland) for viola and piano, Op. 113; Melia Watras, viola; Winston Choi, piano (CD PMR 001)
Cuong Vu: Porch Music viola and trumpet (2015)*; Melia Watras, viola; Cuong Vu, trumpet (CD PMR 001)

Melia Watras: Berceuse for violin and viola (2015)*; Michael Jinsoo Lim, violin; Melia Watras, viola (CD PMR 002) 
Melia Watras: Berceuse with a Singer in London for voice and viola (2015)*; Galia Arad, voice; Melia Watras, viola (CD PMR 001)

Melia Watras: Firefly for voices and cello (2018)*; Melia Watras, voice; Michael Jinsoo Lim, voice; Sæunn Thorsteinsdóttir, cello (CD PMR 002)

Melia Watras: Lament for viola solo (2016)*; Melia Watras, viola (CD PMR 002)

Melia Watras: The Lesson for recorded voice, violin and viola (2017)*; Atar Arad, recorded voice; Michael Jinsoo Lim, violin; Melia Watras, viola (CD PMR 002)  
Melia Watras: Liquid Voices for violin and viola (2013)*; Michael Jinsoo Lim, violin; Melia Watras, viola (CD SLE 70007)

Melia Watras: Lontano for violin and viola (2017)*; Michael Jinsoo Lim, violin; Melia Watras, viola (CD PMR 002)

Melia Watras: O. Reverie for narrator and violin (2018)*; Melia Watras, narrator; Michael Jinsoo Lim, violin (CD PMR 002)

Melia Watras: (one) for voice(s), viola and cello (2018)*; Michael Jinsoo Lim, voice; Melia Watras, viola; Sæunn Thorsteinsdóttir, cello (CD PMR 002) 
Melia Watras: Schumann Resonances for viola and piano (2015)*; Melia Watras, viola; Winston Choi, piano (CD PMR 001)
Melia Watras: Source for viola, percussion and violin (2015)*; Melia Watras, viola; Matthew Kocmieroski, percussion; Michael Jinsoo Lim, violin (CD PMR 001)

Melia Watras: Viola for narrator and viola (2017)*; Arturo Alto, narrator; Melia Watras, viola (CD PMR 002)

Recordings of music composed by Melia Watras
Melia Watras: Berceuse for violin and viola (2015)*; Michael Jinsoo Lim, violin; Melia Watras, viola (CD PMR 002)

Melia Watras: Berceuse with a Singer in London for voice and viola (2015)*; Galia Arad, voice; Melia Watras, viola (CD PMR 001)

Melia Watras: Firefly for voices and cello (2018)*; Melia Watras, voice; Michael Jinsoo Lim, voice; Sæunn Thorsteinsdóttir, cello (CD PMR 002)

Melia Watras: The Lesson for recorded voice, violin and viola (2017)*; Atar Arad, recorded voice; Michael Jinsoo Lim, violin; Melia Watras, viola (CD PMR 002) 
Melia Watras: Liquid Voices for violin and viola (2013)*; Michael Jinsoo Lim, violin; Melia Watras, viola (CD SLE 70007)
Melia Watras: Luminous Points for violin solo (2013)*; Michael Jinsoo Lim, violin (CD SLE 70007)

Melia Watras: Mozart Doesn’t Live in Seattle for voice (2017)*; Vina Vu Valdés, voice (CD PMR 002)

Melia Watras: Lontano for violin and viola (2017)*; Michael Jinsoo Lim, violin; Melia Watras, viola (CD PMR 002)

Melia Watras: O. Reverie for narrator and violin (2018)*; Melia Watras, narrator; Michael Jinsoo Lim, violin (CD PMR 002)

Melia Watras: (one) for voice(s), viola and cello (2018)*; Michael Jinsoo Lim, voice; Melia Watras, viola; Sæunn Thorsteinsdóttir, cello (CD PMR 002) 
Melia Watras: Photo by Mikel for viola solo (2012)*; Melia Watras, viola (CD SLE 70007)
Melia Watras: Prelude for viola solo (2014)*; Atar Arad, viola (CD SLE 70007)
Melia Watras: Schumann Resonances for viola and piano (2015)*; Melia Watras, viola; Winston Choi, piano (CD PMR 001)
Melia Watras: Sonata for viola solo (2012)*; Melia Watras, viola( CD SLE 70007)
Melia Watras: Source for viola, percussion and violin (2015)*; Melia Watras, viola; Matthew Kocmieroski, percussion; Michael Jinsoo Lim, violin (CD PMR 001)

* denotes world premiere recording

Compositions 
Selected works by Melia Watras:

Solo
Violin:

Dear Nightingale for violin solo (2020) 
Echo for violin solo (2020)
Cadenzas to Beethoven's Concerto for Violin and Orchestra, Op. 61 for violin solo (2020)
Homage to Swan Lake for violin solo (2018)
Selvaggio for violin solo (2018)
Doppelgänger Dances for violin solo (2017)
Luminous Points for violin solo (2013)

Viola:

Blue Rose for viola solo (2021)

The cloud that touched the ground for viola solo (2021)

Dear Nightingale for viola solo (2020) 
Black wing, brown wing for viola solo (2019)
Lament for viola solo (2016)
Prelude for viola solo (2014) 
Sonata for viola solo (2012)
Ansioso for viola solo (2012) 
Photo by Mikel for viola solo (2012)
	
Cello:
Vetur for cello solo (2016)
Prelude for cello solo (2014)

Piano: 
Summer Songs for piano (2020)
Otra vex for piano (2020)

Voice:

Weeping Pendula for voice and loop pedal (2021) 
Mozart Doesn't Live in Seattle for voice (2017)

Vetur öngum lánar lið for voice (2016)

Recorded Voice:
Seeing Cypresses with Catherine C. for recorded voice (2017)

Animoji Voice:

Penicilli-yum! for Animoji mouse (2020)

Sotto squeako for Animoji mice (2020)

Baby, I Love You for Animoji mouse (2020)

Accordion:

3 Songs for Bellows, Buttons and Keys for accordion (2021)

Chamber music
Violin and viola:

The almond tree duos: a collection of 18 duos for violin and viola (2019-2021)  
Lontano for violin and viola (2017) 
Vetur öngum lánar lið for violin and viola (2017) 
Wise Tentacles for violin and viola (2017) 
Berceuse for violin and viola (2015) 
Liquid Voices for violin and viola (2013)

Violin and cello:
Vetur öngum lánar lið for violin and cello (2017) 
Wise Tentacles for violin and cello (2017)

Violin, viola and cello:
Kreutzer for violin, viola and cello (2016)

String Quartet: 
Contemplation of Beethoven's Op. 18, No. 4 for string quartet (2020)

Two violas:

The almond tree duos: a collection of 18 duos for two violas (2019-2021)

Viola and piano:
Schumann Resonances for viola and piano (2015)
	
Viola, percussion and violin:
Source for viola, percussion and violin (2015)

Voice and violin:
O. Reverie for voice and violin (2018)
William Wilson for voice and violin (2016)	

Voice and viola:
Viola for narrator and viola (2017)
Berceuse for a Singer in London for voice and viola (2015)

Voice, violin and viola:

5 Poems of Herbert Woodward Martin for narrator, violin and viola (2021)

Voice(s) and cello:
Firefly for voices and cello (2018)
Vetur öngum lánar lið for voice and cello (2016)

Voice(s), viola and cello:
(one) for voice(s), viola and cello (2018)

Voices, viola, Harmonic Canon, Cloud-Chamber Bowls and Bass Marimba:
String Masks for voices, viola, Harmonic Canon, Cloud-Chamber Bowls and Bass Marimba (2017)

Recorded voice, violin and viola:
The Lesson for recorded voice, violin and viola(2017)

Various voices and instruments:
Firefly Songs for various voices and instruments (2015-2018)

Concertos 
Viola and harp:

A brazen butterfly alights for solo viola, harp and strings (2021)

References

External links 
Melia Watras
Frequency Ensemble
'Ep. 46: Melia Watras, violist and composer' Interview by Tigran Arakelyan

American classical violists
Women violists
Indiana University alumni
Juilliard School alumni
Year of birth missing (living people)
Living people